The Pain Clinic is a pro wrestling talk show that airs Saturday mornings on FOX Sports 1280 Rochester in Rochester, New York.

History 
The show was created by Sam Fantauzzo and Rich Jones in 1998. The Pain Clinic covers professional wrestling news, while also interviewing various WWE and TNA superstars.

The Pain Clinic was inducted into the Rochester Wrestling Hall of Fame in 2010.

The radio show can be heard live on FOX Sports 1280 Rochester and iHeartRadio. Podcasts of the show are made available at thepainclinic.net and on iTunes.

Announcers

The Pain Clinic roster currently consists of the host "The Cashman" Richie Rich ('98-present) and regular co-hosts Danger Boy ('98-present), "The Artiste" Rob Sanderson ('01-present) and "DC" Dan Cole ('12-present).

External links
Official Site
The Pain Clinic on Twitter
The Pain Clinic on MySpace
1280 WHTK

American sports radio programs